Materials Science and Engineering may refer to several journals in the field of materials science and engineering:

 Materials Science and Engineering A
 Materials Science and Engineering B
 Materials Science and Engineering C
 Materials Science and Engineering R, reviews

Materials science journals
Elsevier academic journals